Pashgar (also Romanized as Pashkar) is a village in Dodangeh Rural District, in the Central District of Behbahan County, Khuzestan Province, Iran. At the 2006 census, its population was 31, in 6 families.

References 

Populated places in Behbahan County